Rui Manuel Linhares Areias (born 22 November 1993) is a Portuguese professional footballer who plays for Varzim S.C. as a forward.

Club career
Born in Guimarães, Areias joined the academy of local club Vitória S.C. at the age of 9. He made his senior debut with their reserves on 11 December 2012, coming on as a second-half substitute in a 0−0 home draw against C.F. União for the Segunda Liga. His first goals came also that season, but his brace was achieved in a 2−4 home loss to F.C. Penafiel on 12 May 2013.

Areias' first appearance in the Primeira Liga with the first team occurred on 14 December 2014, when he played 15 minutes of the 0−0 home draw against Rio Ave FC. He spent the 2016–17 and 2017–18 campaigns on loan to second-division sides FC Porto B and F.C. Arouca.

In June 2018, the free agent Areias signed a one-year contract with Penafiel also of the second tier. He scored six competitive goals during his spell at the Estádio Municipal 25 de Abril, including two in a 3–2 away victory over C.D. Trofense in the second round of the Taça de Portugal. He also found the net in both league fixtures against Guimarães B (3–2 and 5–4 wins).

On 4 July 2019, Areias agreed to a one-year deal at C.D. Mafra of the same division.

References

External links

Portuguese League profile 

1993 births
Living people
Sportspeople from Guimarães
Portuguese footballers
Association football forwards
Primeira Liga players
Liga Portugal 2 players
Campeonato de Portugal (league) players
Vitória S.C. B players
Vitória S.C. players
FC Porto B players
F.C. Arouca players
F.C. Penafiel players
C.D. Mafra players
S.C. Covilhã players
AD Fafe players
Varzim S.C. players
Portugal youth international footballers